Vaugeois is a French surname. Notable people with the surname include:

Denis Vaugeois (born 1935), Canadian historian
Henri Vaugeois (1864–1916), French politician
Lise Vaugeois, Canadian politician

French-language surnames